The following are lists of waterfalls in the world by height, classified into two categories — natural and artificial. Natural waterfalls are further subdivided between overall height and tallest single drop. Each column (Waterfall, Height, Locality, Country) is sortable by using the up/down link in the column headings at the top of each column.

World's tallest natural waterfalls

By overall height
This list consists of waterfalls which are known to have an overall height of at least . Underwater falls, such as the  Denmark Strait cataract, are not included.

By tallest single drop
This list consists of the waterfalls which are known to have a singular individual step with a vertical drop of at least .

World's tallest artificial waterfalls

See also

List of waterfalls
List of waterfalls by flow rate
List of waterfalls by type

References

External links
World Waterfall Database: Worlds Tallest Waterfalls

Heightness
Waterfalls
Waterfalls